New Mexico State Road 30 (NM 30) is a  state highway in the U.S. state of New Mexico maintained by the New Mexico Department of Transportation (NMDOT). The nearly nine-mile (14 km) road, located in northeastern Santa Fe County, begins  NM 502 in San Ildefonso Pueblo and runs northward to the combined routes of U.S. Route 84 (US 84) and U.S. Route 285 (US 285) in Española.

Route description

NM 30 begins as a two-lane road along NM 502 in San Ildefonso Pueblo. The road travels through San Ildefonso tribal land about half its length, then passes through Santa Clara Pueblo. The road enters Española as Los Alamos Highway and becomes a four-lane divided street as it turns to the north along the rest of its route terminating at US 84 / US 285 along the east side of the Plaza de Española.

Major intersections

See also

 List of state roads in New Mexico

References

External links

030
Transportation in Santa Fe County, New Mexico